
Gmina Warta Bolesławiecka is a rural gmina (administrative district) in Bolesławiec County, Lower Silesian Voivodeship, in south-western Poland.

Neighbouring gminas
Gmina Warta Bolesławiecka is bordered by the gminas of Bolesławiec, Chojnów, Gromadka, Lwówek Śląski, Pielgrzymka and Zagrodno.

Villages
The gmina contains the villages of Iwiny, Jurków, Lubków, Raciborowice Dolne, Raciborowice Górne, Szczytnica, Tomaszów Bolesławiecki, Warta Bolesławiecka, Wartowice and Wilczy Las.

References

Warta Boleslawiecka
Bolesławiec County